Diachus auratus, the bronze leaf beetle, is a species of case-bearing leaf beetle in the family Chrysomelidae. It is found in Australia, the Caribbean, Central America, North America, Oceania, South America, and Southern Asia.

References

Further reading

External links

 

Cryptocephalinae
Articles created by Qbugbot
Beetles described in 1801